New Boy or newboys or variation, may refer to:

Entertainment
 New Boy (novel), a 1996 novel by William Sutcliffe
 New Boy (play), a 2000 adaptation of the William Sutcliffe novel
 The New Boy (play), an 1894 comic farce by Arthur Law
 New Boy (film), a 2007 short film

Music
 New Boyz, U.S. rapper duo
 New Boy (EP), a 1994 EP by the Connells
 Newboys (song), 1978 song by The Adverts from the punk album Crossing the Red Sea with The Adverts
 New Boy (song), 1999 song by Pu Shu

Other uses
 NewBoy, FZCO, Emirati company